Red Oxx Manufacturing, Inc. is an American manufacturing company which produces travel luggage. The company was founded in 1986 by Jim Markel Sr., a retired Green Beret Captain, and was joined by his son Jim Markel Jr. and Perry Jones, also retired military parachute riggers. In the U.S., the products have won a  'National Award for Luggage'. Also, the Red Oxx Safari Beano bag was Outside Magazine's 2004 Bag of the Year.

References

External links 
Red Oxx Manufacturing Official Site

Camping equipment manufacturers
Hiking equipment